Roboré is a town in eastern Bolivia. Located in Chiquitos Province, Roboré was founded by Dr. Ángel Sandoval in November 26th, 1947.

It is home to the Regimiento De Infanteria 15 Junin Roboré of the Bolivian Army.

Transport 
Roboré lies on the eastern railway network of Bolivia.

It is served by Roboré Airport.

Climate

See also 
 Railway stations in Bolivia
 Transport in Bolivia

References 

Populated places in Santa Cruz Department (Bolivia)